Højer, is a town with a population of 1,102 (1 January 2022), which was the seat of the former Højer municipality in south Denmark, in Region of Southern Denmark on the west coast of the Jutland peninsula.

Højer Municipality

The former Højer Municipality covered an area of 117 km2, and had a total population of 2,861 (2005).  Its last mayor was Peter Christensen, a member of the Social Democrats (Socialdemokraterne) political party.

The coastal area of the former municipality is a nature reserve.

 Daler Parish
 Emmerlev Parish
 Hjerpsted Parish
 Højer Parish

On 1 January 2007 Højer municipality ceased to exist due to Kommunalreformen ("The Municipality Reform" of 2007).  It was merged with Bredebro, Løgumkloster, Nørre-Rangstrup, Skærbæk, and Tønder municipalities to form the new Tønder Municipality.  This created a municipality with an area of 1,352 km2 and a total population of 42,645 (2005).

Photos

References

External links
 Tønder municipality's official website 

 Weather forecast Højer, Denmark weather-atlas.com

Further reading
 Municipal statistics: NetBorger Kommunefakta, delivered from KMD aka Kommunedata (Municipal Data)
 Municipal mergers and neighbors: Eniro new municipalities map

Former municipalities of Denmark
Cities and towns in the Region of Southern Denmark
Tønder Municipality

de:Højer
no:Højer
sv:Höjer kommun